Aleksandra Satler (born 10 January 1997) is a Kazakhstani footballer who plays as a defender for the Kazakhstan women's national team.

References

1997 births
Living people
Women's association football defenders
Kazakhstani women's footballers
Kazakhstan women's international footballers